The 1975 World 600, the 16th running of the event, was a NASCAR Winston Cup Series racing event that took place on May 25, 1975, at Charlotte Motor Speedway in Concord, North Carolina.

Race report
There were 40 drivers on the grid. Coo Coo Marlin had an engine problem on lap 33 out of 400 laps - earning him a last place position and $1,455 ($ when adjusted for inflation). Richard Petty would defeat Cale Yarborough by one lap in front of 90,600 spectators; who had no idea that history was being made right before their eyes. Petty would earn $30,290 ($ in when adjusted for inflation) on his long anticipated first win at Charlotte, despite having to change four tires early in the race and falling behind a lap. Petty rallied back and proceeded to lap the field.

Seven time Winston Cup Series Champion Dale Earnhardt would make his debut here; finishing 22nd in a Dodge vehicle. African-American driver Randy Bethea would race his only NASCAR Cup Series race here; he would complete in 251 laps before engine problems relegated him to the sideline. Joe Frasson failed to qualify for this race while Darel Dieringer would make his NASCAR comeback here. Richard Childress would also compete in his event; finishing one place behind his future employee Dale Earnhardt. Both drivers were running at the finish, 45 laps down.

Other drivers who failed to qualify were Bill Dennis (#20), Ferrel Harris (#82), Carl Adams (#65), and Elmo Langley (#64).

Results

Top 10 finishers

Timeline
Section reference: 
 Start of race: Lennie Pond officially began the event with the pole position.
 Lap 14: Randy Bethea spun out on turn three, bringing out the first caution of the race which ended on lap 17.
 Lap 33: Coo Coo Marlin managed to blow his engine, making him the last-place finisher.
 Lap 55: Benny Parsons blew his engine while racing.
 Lap 96: G.C. Spencer managed to blow his engine while racing at high speeds.
 Lap 112: Travis Tiller spun out on turn two, bringing out the second caution of the race which ended on lap 115.
 Lap 114: Cale Yarborough took over the lead from Richard Petty before losing it to Richard Petty on lap 166.
 Lap 157: Cecil Gordon noticed that his engine blew, forcing him to exit the race prematurely.
 Lap 165: Dick Brooks spun out on turn two, bringing the third caution of the race which ended on lap 168.
 Lap 166: Richard Petty took over the lead from Cale Yarborough before losing it back to Cale Yarborough on lap 231.
 Lap 198: Lennie Pond's transmission became problematic, making him the first DNF in the race not related to his vehicle's engine.
 Lap 208: Bobby Isaac's vehicle had some vibration issues, forcing him off the track.
 Lap 236: Richard Petty took over the lead from David Pearson before losing it to Cale Yarborough on lap 297.
 Lap 239: Dave Marcis blew his engine while racing, forcing him to retire from the race.
 Lap 251: Randy Bethea managed to acquire an engine failure in his only NASCAR Cup Series race.
 Lap 298: Richard Petty took over the lead from Cale Yarborough, making the decisive move that would get Petty the race win.
 Lap 306: Harry Gant managed to blow his engine, ending his day on the track.
 Lap 349: Dick Skillen managed to blow his engine, causing him to leave the race early.
 Lap 373: Darel Dieringer managed to blow his engine, forcing him to accept a 12th-place finish.
 Finish: Richard Petty was officially declared the winner of the event.

Standings after the race

References

World 600
World 600
Dale Earnhardt
NASCAR races at Charlotte Motor Speedway